The 2015 Big West Conference women's basketball tournament took place March 10–14, 2015. The first two rounds occurred at Titan Gym while the semifinals and championship were at the Honda Center in Anaheim, California. The winner of the tournament received the conference's automatic bid to the 2015 NCAA Women's Division I Basketball Tournament.

Format
The top eight teams qualified for the 2015 Big West tournament. Seeds 1 and 2 received a double-bye while seeds 3 and 4 received a single bye. The first round featured 5 vs. 8 and 6 vs. 7. The lowest seed from round 1 moved on to play seed 3 in the quarterfinals while the other winner moved on to play seed 4 in the quarterfinals. The semifinals once again had the lowest seed from the quarterfinals move on to play seed 1  while the other remaining seed played seed 2 in the semifinals.

Bracket

See also 
Big West Conference women's basketball tournament
2015 Big West Conference men's basketball tournament

References

External links
Big West Women's Basketball Tournament website

Big West Conference women's basketball